is a Fukui Railway Fukubu Line railway station located in the city of Fukui, Fukui Prefecture, Japan.

Lines

Station layout
The station consists of one ground-level island platform connected to the two-story station building by a level crossing. The station is staffed between 7:10 and 19:30.

Adjacent stations

History
It was relocated 400 meters to the south and renamed . and was renamed to the present name on March 25, 2010.

Surrounding area
 Long a suburb of Fukui, the area is mostly residential.
 To the east lies Minami-Fukui Freight Terminal on the Hokuriku Main Line, which is connected to Sekijūjimae Station by a tunnel.
 Other points of interest include:
 Fukui Minori Post Office
 Fukui Red Cross Hospital
 Fukui Higashi School for the Disabled, Tsukimi Campus
 Fukui Red Cross Blood Center
 Fukui Municipal Minori Elementary School
 Fukui Municipal Kida Elementary School
 Fukui Municipal Meirin Junior High School

See also
 List of railway stations in Japan

References

External links

  

Railway stations in Fukui Prefecture
Railway stations in Japan opened in 1925
Fukui Railway Fukubu Line
Fukui (city)